The Indio Hills are a low mountain range in the Colorado Desert. located in Riverside County, California's Coachella Valley. The hills were named for their proximity to the city of Indio, and are sometimes referred to as the Indio Mud Hills or Indio Sand Hills.

Geology
The Indio Hills are located in the Coachella Valley along the San Andreas Fault. The hills have natural springs along the fault. These support native California Fan Palm (Washingtonia filifera) oases habitats.

Geographic Features

Peaks
Edom Hill, : Located near Thousand Palms, Edom Hill is one of the highest peaks in the range. The prominence of the hill within the Coachella Valley has made it a chosen location for numerous communication towers.
Flat Top Mountain, 
Squaw Hill, : A promontory overlooking the Thousand Palms Oasis.

Canyons
Pushawalla Canyon, 
Thousand Palms Canyon,

Oases
Biskra Palms, : Named in honor of Biskra, Algeria.
Hidden Palms, 
Macomber Palms, 
Pushawalla Palms, 
Thousand Palms Oasis, : The name origin for the community of Thousand Palms.
Willis Palms,

Parks
The Indio Hills Palms State Reserve and Coachella Valley National Wildlife Refuge are protected lands of the Indio Hills.

See also

 Indio Hills Palms

References

External links
 Official Indio Hills Palms State Park website
 Official Coachella Valley Preserve website

Mountain ranges of the Colorado Desert
Mountain ranges of Riverside County, California
Indio, California
Coachella Valley
Hills of California
Mountain ranges of Southern California